Hu Yuxiang (born 22 May 1998) is a Chinese female badminton player.

Achievements

BWF World Junior Championships 
Mixed doubles

Asian Junior Championships 
Mixed doubles

BWF International Challenge/Series 
Women's doubles

  BWF International Challenge tournament
  BWF International Series tournament

References

External links 
 

1998 births
Living people
Chinese female badminton players
Badminton players from Guangdong
People from Dongguan
21st-century Chinese women